State Highway 300 (SH 300) is a Texas state highway that runs from Longview northwest to Gilmer.  It is also known as Gilmer Road in Gregg County.

Route description
SH 300 begins at an intersection with U.S. Route 80 on the west side of Longview, and travels northwest through residential sections of the city. The route continues to the northwest, passing through agricultural sections of southeastern Upshur County before reaching its terminus at U.S. Route 271 and State Highway 155 on the far southern edge of Gilmer. The route travels nearly 19 miles.

History
SH 300 was previously designated on January 23, 1939 on a route from Atlanta south to Frazier Creek. On November 20, 1939, SH 300 was extended south to SH 49. The route was redesignated on December 16, 1943 as SH 43 when it was extended farther north. The current route was designated on August 2, 1968, replacing FM 1403.

Major intersections

References

Transportation in Gregg County, Texas
Transportation in Upshur County, Texas
300